Me Moan is the second studio album by Daughn Gibson, an American singer-songwriter and the former drummer of Pearls and Brass. It was released in July 2013 under Sub Pop Records.

Track list

References

2013 albums
Sub Pop albums